Actinopus valencianus is a species of mygalomorph spiders in the family Actinopodidae. It is found in Venezuela.

References

valencianus
Spiders described in 1889